Liga II is the second level women's football league in Romania. A second tier women's football competition was first created in 1990 under the name Divizia B. After the fall of communism, organised women's football started to take off, and the founded clubs were distributed  into 2 leagues - Divizia A with 12 teams and Divizia B with 30 teams grouped into 3 series, following a tournament called Cupa Libertății. Some time after, the number women's clubs declined, and the division was disbanded.

The second-level league was reintroduced starting with the 2013–14 season, when it formally received the name Liga I, following the introduction of Superliga as the top-tier league. However, as of the 2017–18 season, it was rebranded as Liga II, since the Superliga brand was quietly dropped altogether.

Format
Since its reintroduction in 2013, Liga II has had two parallel regional divisions (series). Second teams of clubs in the top league cannot promote.

The 2020-21 season has had three parallel regional divisions (groups) with the group’s winner teams (CSS Târgoviște, Ladies Târgu Mureș, Dream Team Bucharest) qualifying for promotional play-off as well as the best second team (ACS United Bihor). The matches in the play-off for promotion to the Women's League 1 will be played in a single round, resulting in three games for each team, the first two ranked will be promoted to Liga 1 Feminin.

Winners
The following is a list of all Romanian women's second-tier football league winners since its reintroduction in 2013. The first place is declared the champion of the series, promotes to Liga I, and is presented with a trophy. The top three teams currently also receive gold, silver and bronze medals from the Romanian Football Federation. Promoted teams are denoted in italics.

References

Women
Professional sports leagues in Romania